A list of films produced by the Israeli film industry released in 2015.

References

External links
 Israeli films of 2015 at the Internet Movie Database

Lists of 2015 films by country or language
Film
2015